Amar Babaria (born May 10, 1975, from Mumbai) is an Indian actor, director, writer, theater artist, and voice over actor. He is also multilingual, speaking Hindi, English, Gujarati, Marathi, and Urdu.

Early life and career
Amar Babaria was born and raised in Mumbai in a Gujarati family. He has two elder sisters. He did several plays in school.  Amar started his acting career during college in 1995, making his professional debut in an English play titled "Carry On Professor". During the early years of his theatrical career he acted in plays speaking in multiple languages including English, Marathi, Gujarati, Hindi and Urdu. In 1997, he travelled to the US and Canada for his Gujrati play Derani Jethani. Over the next three years, Amar appeared in plays such as Maa Retire Hoti Hai, Dr. Mukta, Pati, Patni Aur Mein. Babaria's first acting role was in a Hindi play titled Maa Retire Hoti Hai with Jaya Bachchan. This was followed, in 2000, by a part in the Hindi play called 'Dr. Mukta', where he worked with Jaya Bachchan again. Finally, in 2001, Amar acted in another Hindi play called Pati, Patni Aur Mein with Shatrughan Sinha. All three of these were directed by Ramesh Talwar. These plays were performed across India, United States, Canada, United Kingdom, and United Arab Emirates. Since 2005, Amar Babaria has appeared in television commercials, corporate videos, films, short films, music videos and copy-writing. Currently, he is the owner of a production house called Actors and Models.

Dubbing career
Amar is a voice actor who has been lending his voice to hundreds of productions since 1996.

Ad films and television commercials

Drama

Filmography as a writer for dubbed films

Dubbing roles

Animated series

Live action television series

Live action films

Hollywood films

Indian films

Animated films

See also
List of Indian dubbing artists

References

External links

1975 births
Living people
21st-century Indian male actors
Indian male voice actors
Male actors from Mumbai
Male actors in Hindi cinema